14974 Počátky, provisional designation , is a stony background asteroid from the middle region of the asteroid belt, approximately 4 kilometers in diameter. It was discovered by Czech astronomer Miloš Tichý at Kleť Observatory in the Czech Republic on 22 September 1997, and named for the Czech town Počátky.

Classification and orbit 

Počátky is a stony S-type asteroid, that orbits the Sun in the middle main-belt at a distance of 2.4–2.9 AU once every 4 years and 3 months (1,559 days). Its orbit has an eccentricity of 0.09 and an inclination of 4° with respect to the ecliptic. A first precovery was taken at ESO's La Silla Observatory in 1991, extending the asteroid's observation arc by 6 years prior to its discovery.

Physical characteristics 

Two rotational lightcurves for this asteroid were obtained from photometric observations made at the U.S Palomar Transient Factory, California, in August 2010 and February 2012.

According to the survey carried out by the NEOWISE mission of NASA's space-based Wide-field Infrared Survey Explorer, Počátky measures 4.0 kilometers in diameter and its surface has an albedo of 0.23, while the Collaborative Asteroid Lightcurve Link (CALL) assumes an untypically low albedo for stony asteroids of 0.10, and thus calculates a larger diameter of 4.9 kilometers.

Naming 

This minor planet was named after the south Bohemian town of Počátky, Czech Republic. It is the birthplace of the discoverer Miloš Tichý. The approved naming citation was published by the Minor Planet Center on 11 November 2000.

References

External links 
 Asteroid Lightcurve Database (LCDB), query form (info )
 Dictionary of Minor Planet Names, Google books
 Asteroids and comets rotation curves, CdR – Observatoire de Genève, Raoul Behrend
 Discovery Circumstances: Numbered Minor Planets (10001)-(15000) – Minor Planet Center
 
 

014974
Discoveries by Miloš Tichý
Named minor planets
19970922